Leung Chu Yan (born 1979) is a table tennis player from Hong Kong. He competed at the 2000, 2004 and 2012 Summer Olympics.

References

External links
 

Hong Kong male table tennis players
Olympic table tennis players of Hong Kong
Table tennis players at the 2000 Summer Olympics
Table tennis players at the 2004 Summer Olympics
Table tennis players at the 2012 Summer Olympics
1979 births
Living people
Place of birth missing (living people)
Asian Games medalists in table tennis
Table tennis players at the 2002 Asian Games
Table tennis players at the 2006 Asian Games
Table tennis players at the 2014 Asian Games
Table tennis players from Guangdong
People from Nanhai District
Medalists at the 2002 Asian Games
Medalists at the 2006 Asian Games
Asian Games bronze medalists for Hong Kong